The 2015 LPGA of Korea Tour is the 38th season of the LPGA of Korea Tour, the professional golf tour for women operated by the Korea Ladies Professional Golf' Association. It consists of 31 golf tournaments, 28 played in South Korea, two in China, and one in Japan.

Schedule
The number in parentheses after winners' names show the player's total number wins in official money individual events on the LPGA of Korea Tour, including that event.

Events in bold are majors.

LPGA KEB-HanaBank Championship is co-sanctioned with LPGA Tour.
Kumho Tire Ladies Open and Hyundai China Ladies Open are co-sanctioned with China LPGA Tour.

External links
 

LPGA of Korea Tour
LPGA of Korea Tour
LPGA of Korea Tour